David Pierce was an American politician. He served in the New Hampshire House of Representatives from 2006 to 2012, and in the New Hampshire Senate for the 5th district from 2012 to 2016.

He was the first openly gay person to ever run for and win a seat in the 24-member New Hampshire Senate. Pierce is also widely credited for his speech before the New Hampshire House on the issue of same-sex marriage in New Hampshire, which reportedly swayed several undecided legislators to support the legislation and led to its passage on a narrow vote.  He was also known for his advocacy on voting rights in particular and his work on constitutional issues generally. In 2008, Pierce completed Harvard University's John F. Kennedy School of Government program for Senior Executives in State and Local Government as a David Bohnett Foundation LGBTQ Victory Institute Leadership Fellow.

References

External links
David Pierce

Democratic Party members of the New Hampshire House of Representatives
Democratic Party New Hampshire state senators
LGBT state legislators in New Hampshire
Gay politicians
Living people
People from Hanover, New Hampshire
21st-century American politicians
Year of birth missing (living people)
21st-century LGBT people